Lorne Greene's New Wilderness was a wildlife documentary series that ran from 1982 to 1987 with 104 episodes.

Season 1: 1982–1983

Season 2: 1983–1984

Season 3: 1984–1985

Season 4: 1985–1986

Season 5: 1986–1987

References

Lists of Canadian television series episodes